Ian Robert Mason (14 April 1942 – 18 July 2017) was a New Zealand cricketer who played six first-class matches between 1960 and 1966. He represented Wellington in the Plunket Shield.

He and his wife Jane had four children, Dr Diana Amundsen was the eldest, followed by Paul Mason, Carolyn Mortland and Sonia Minnaar. He died in Tauranga on 18 July 2017.

References

External links
 Cricinfo: Ian Mason

 

1942 births
2017 deaths
New Zealand cricketers
Wellington cricketers
Cricketers from Wellington City